Frederick Warburton (8 August 1880 – 29 November 1948) was an English football player and manager active in the early part of the twentieth century.

Career

Playing career
Warburton played football professionally in England at the turn of the century. He played one game for Bolton Wanderers and then after slipping into the non-League with Bryn Central, he played for Bury for two seasons, registering five goals in 11 appearances from a position of inside forward. He later played in the Southern Football League for Swindon Town and Plymouth Argyle before playing for Accrington Stanley and Morecambe.

Coaching career
Warburton managed the Dutch national team from 1919 to 1923.

Warburton was in charge of the team at the 1920 Summer Olympics, winning a bronze medal.

Personal life
He was married to Pauline Walker and had ten children.

Warburton's sons Joe and George were also professional footballers.

References

1880 births
1948 deaths
English footballers
English Football League players
Southern Football League players
Bolton Wanderers F.C. players
Bury F.C. players
Swindon Town F.C. players
Plymouth Argyle F.C. players
Accrington Stanley F.C. (1891) players
Morecambe F.C. players
English football managers
HVV Den Haag managers
Netherlands national football team managers
English expatriate football managers
Medalists at the 1920 Summer Olympics
Olympic bronze medalists for the Netherlands
Association football inside forwards
Footballers from Bolton